Ptychocroca apenicillia is a species of moth of the family Tortricidae. It is found in Chile (Aconcagua Province, Santiago Province, Maule Region and Coquimbo Region).

The wingspan is about 26 mm. The forewing pattern is variable and can consist of a well-defined black-and-white contrasting pattern or is variably obscured with grey overscaling.

Etymology
The species name refers to the absence of the hindwing hair-pencil.

References

Moths described in 2003
Euliini
Moths of South America
Taxa named by Józef Razowski
Endemic fauna of Chile